ESICE Eastern Sierra Institute for Collaborative Education (ESICE) is a 501 (C)(3) nonprofit incorporated in 1997, that creates educational opportunities for people of all ages, celebrating the region’s unique cultural, natural and scientific resources, based, in its early days at the University of California White Mountain Research Station.  ESICE focuses on improved communication of scientific information to the public. ESICE provides for a range of innovative educational programs that focus on collaborative approaches to life science, environmental, and social questions.

Programs
The Eastern Sierra Institute for Collaborative Education is a non-profit organization which supports innovative education collaboration to address real world environmental and social issues.

Eastern Sierra Watershed Project
ESICE programs include the Eastern Sierra Watershed Project, an experiential education program for elementary and middle school students to learn about the unique Eastern Sierra ecosystems and natural resource. The program applies required science studies to real-life situation, the historic re-watering of the Lower Owens River.  The students are engaged in collecting scientific data approximating the data a scientist would collect documenting changes in the river ecosystems.

Roadside Heritage
ESICE also conceived, developed, and brought about the implementation of the Roadside Heritage program, that engages middle school students in collecting interviews with knowledgeable citizens and research to create high quality audio programs for motorists traveling through the region.

Partners
The institute partners with a variety of government agencies, non-profits, academic organizations and corporations.

Notes

External links
Official Eastern Sierra Institute for Collaborative Education website
Eastern Sierra Watershed Project

Education in Inyo County, California
Owens Valley
Sierra Nevada (United States)